Fernando Medrano Medina (born May 14, 1988) is a Nicaraguan former swimmer, who specialized in butterfly events. Medrano qualified for the men's 100 m butterfly at the 2004 Summer Olympics in Athens, by receiving a Universality place from FINA, in an entry time of 1:00.80. He participated in heat one against two other swimmers Luis Matias of Angola and Rad Aweisat of Palestine. He raced to second place by nearly two seconds behind winner Matias in 1:00.91. Medrano failed to advance into the semifinals, as he placed fifty-eighth overall in the preliminaries.

References

1988 births
Living people
Nicaraguan male swimmers
Olympic swimmers of Nicaragua
Swimmers at the 2004 Summer Olympics
Male butterfly swimmers